James Craig Ruby (May 30, 1896 – September 9, 1980) was an American college basketball player and coach.  A two-time All-American and All-Missouri Valley Conference forward at the University of Missouri, he took over the head coaching position of his alma-mater in 1920. Ruby coached the Tigers for two seasons, compiling a record of 33 wins and only 2 losses. Both of Ruby's Missouri teams were retroactively named national champions by the Premo-Porretta Power Poll. Ruby was subsequently recruited by University of Illinois athletic director George Huff to take over the Fighting Illini’s men's basketball coaching duties.

Beginning in 1922 and continuing on for the next 14 years, Ruby compiled a record of 148 wins and 95 losses. While playing in the Big Ten Conference, Ruby's teams recorded 94 wins and 74 losses and won the conference championship 2 times.  Ruby left the program in 1936 with coaching duties given to Douglas R. Mills.

Ruby and legendary Kansas coach Phog Allen actively campaigned together for higher baskets to offset the advantage of tall centers. He also advocated the elimination of the dribble to do away with stalling, and wanted the hoop enlarged to 20 inches in diameter rather than the standard 18. In 1930 Ruby served as the president of the National Association of Basketball Coaches (NABC).

Ruby retired from coaching to pursue a career with the Kansas City-based, Hallmark greeting card company at the age of 39. He died in 1980 in Johnson County, Kansas at the age of 84.

Ruby married Dorothy Whitney on August 11, 1924 in Chicago, Illinois.  They had a daughter, Joyce, and son, Jay Whitney.

Head coaching record

References

1896 births
1980 deaths
All-American college men's basketball players
American men's basketball coaches
Basketball coaches from Missouri
Basketball players from Missouri
Illinois Fighting Illini men's basketball coaches
Missouri Tigers men's basketball coaches
Missouri Tigers men's basketball players
People from Van Buren County, Iowa
American men's basketball players